Dost is a surname. People with the surname include:

 Abdul Rahim Muslim Dost (born 1960), Afghan journalist and jeweller
 Andrew Dost (born 1983), American musician
 Bas Dost (born 1989), Dutch football player
 Bernd Dost (1939–2015), German journalist, filmmaker, writer and publisher
 Erol Dost (born 1999), Bulgarian football player
 Jan Dost (born 1965), Syrian Kurdish poet
 Jeanne Dost, American economist
 Kader Dost (born 2000), Turkish race walker
 Marcel Dost (born 1969), Dutch decathlete 
 Sultan Mohammad Dost (born 1932), Afghan wrestler

Turkish-language surnames